Arroyomolinos may refer to:
 Arroyomolinos, Madrid, a municipality in the autonomous community of Madrid, Spain
 Arroyomolinos, Cáceres, a municipality in the province of Cáceres, Extremadura, Spain
 Arroyomolinos de la Vera, a municipality in the province of Cáceres, Extremadura, Spain
 Arroyomolinos de León, a municipality in the province of Huelva, Andalusia, Spain